Lloyd Stuart Roger James (born 16 February 1988) is a Welsh professional footballer who plays as a midfielder for Taunton Town.

Club career

Southampton 
He attended Ashton Park School in the Ashton Gate area of Bristol. He was a member of Southampton's youth team that reached the final of the FA Youth Cup in 2005, losing on aggregate to Ipswich Town.

He made his debut for the Wales under-21 team against Cyprus U21s on 15 November 2005.

He was called into the first team squad for the FA Cup tie at Torquay United on 6 January 2007. On 9 August 2008, James started in Southampton's match against Cardiff City.

He scored his first goal in a 3–1 victory over Exeter City on Boxing Day, 2009. He scored his second goal with a 20-yard volley in a 1–1 draw with Brentford. On 15 May 2010, James was named in a list of 13 players to be released from Southampton before the start of the 2010–11 season.

Colchester United 
Colchester United manager John Ward then offered him a trial for at least two weeks. James played in three games impressing enough to be offered a contract. The two-year deal was finalised on 22 July. He scored his first goals for Colchester when he scored twice in an FA Cup tie against Crewe Alexandra on 12 November 2011. His first league goal came in a 4–1 win over Bury on 10 December 2011. On 26 June 2012, James rejected the offer of a new contract with Colchester United and he left the club on 1 July upon the expiry of his current contract.

Crawley Town 
On 2 March 2012, he joined League Two promotion hopefuls Crawley Town on loan. In April 2012, due to illness and not being able to hold down a regular first team place at Crawley Town, James returned to Colchester United for the remaining few games of 2011–12.

Leyton Orient 
After a short trial, James signed for League One club Leyton Orient on a two-year contract. He went on to make 138 appearances and score 11 goals for the O's over four seasons at Brisbane Road.

James was released by Leyton Orient at the end of the 2015–16 season.

Exeter City 
On 25 May 2016 James signed with League Two club Exeter City.

Forest Green Rovers 
On 4 July 2018 he signed for League Two side Forest Green Rovers from Exeter for an undisclosed fee, agreeing a two-year contract. On 11 December 2019, James joined National League side Torquay United on a one-month loan deal. On 28 February 2020, James left Forest Green Rovers after his contract was terminated by mutual consent.

Bath City 
In February 2020, James signed for National League South side Bath City following his release from Forest Green Rovers.

Taunton Town
On 17 December 2021, James joined Southern League Premier Division South side Taunton Town on loan for the remainder of the 2021-22 season.

Having helped Taunton Town to promotion, James joined the club on a permanent basis in June 2022.

Career statistics

Honours 
Southampton
 Football League Trophy winner: 2009–10
 FA Youth Cup runner-up: 2004–05

Leyton Orient
 League One play-off finalists: 2013–14

References

External links 
 

1988 births
Living people
Footballers from Bristol
Welsh footballers
Wales youth international footballers
Wales under-21 international footballers
Southampton F.C. players
Colchester United F.C. players
Crawley Town F.C. players
Leyton Orient F.C. players
Exeter City F.C. players
Forest Green Rovers F.C. players
Torquay United F.C. players
Bath City F.C. players
Taunton Town F.C. players
English Football League players
National League (English football) players
Southern Football League players
Association football defenders
Association football midfielders